Aleksandr Ignatenko (born 29 March 1963) is a Soviet wrestler. He competed at the 1988 Summer Olympics, the 1992 Summer Olympics and the 1996 Summer Olympics.

References

1963 births
Living people
Russian male sport wrestlers
Soviet male sport wrestlers
Olympic wrestlers of the Soviet Union
Olympic wrestlers of the Unified Team
Olympic wrestlers of Russia
Wrestlers at the 1988 Summer Olympics
Wrestlers at the 1992 Summer Olympics
Wrestlers at the 1996 Summer Olympics
Place of birth missing (living people)